Gamvik Church is a parish church of the Church of Norway in Gamvik Municipality in Troms og Finnmark county, Norway. It is located in the village of Gamvik. It is the main church for the Gamvik parish which is part of the Hammerfest prosti (deanery) in the Diocese of Nord-Hålogaland. The white, concrete church was built in a long church design in 1958 using plans drawn up by the architects Gudolf Blakstad and Herman Munthe-Kaas. The church seats about 224 people.

History
The first church in Gamvik was the Samekapellet which was moved here in 1858 from Tana Municipality. That chapel was taken down and replaced with a new church in 1894 that was designed by the architect D. G. Evjen. That new church had 264 seats. On 5 November 1944 the retreating German army burned down the church near the end of World War II. The present church was constructed in 1957-1958 as the new main church for the municipality. It was designed by the architects Gudolf Blakstad and Herman Munthe-Kaas. It was consecrated on 27 April 1958 by the Bishop Alf Wiig. The present Gamvik Church is built of concrete and has 224 seats in the main room and 80 in the parish hall.

Media gallery

See also
List of churches in Nord-Hålogaland

References

Gamvik
Churches in Finnmark
20th-century Church of Norway church buildings
Churches completed in 1958
1858 establishments in Norway
Long churches in Norway
Concrete churches in Norway